Emma Humphries (born 27 July 1995) is an Australian rules footballer who plays for West Coast in the AFL Women's (AFLW) competition. She has previously played for Melbourne and North Melbourne.

AFLW career

Melbourne
Humphries was drafted by Melbourne with their eighth selection and fifty-seventh overall in the 2016 AFL Women's draft. She made her debut in the fifteen point loss to Brisbane at Casey Fields in the opening round of the 2017 season. She played every match in her debut season to finish with seven games. Melbourne signed Humphries for the 2018 season during the trade period in May 2017.

North Melbourne
In May 2018, Humphries was traded to North Melbourne. 

At the end of the 2020 AFL women's season Humphries was delisted by North Melbourne.

West Coast
In June 2022, after a good season with Hawthorn in the VFL Women's league, Humphries was signed by West Coast as a priority player.

References

External links 

1995 births
Living people
Melbourne Football Club (AFLW) players
Australian rules footballers from Tasmania
North Melbourne Football Club (AFLW) players